Port Rexton is a small town in the Canadian province of Newfoundland and Labrador. It is located on the East Coast of the island of Newfoundland at the north end of Robinhood Bay, about 10 minutes east of Trinity and 3 hours north of St. John's. The town had a population of 690 in 1940, 449 in 1951, 454 in 1956, 351 in the Canada 2006 Census, 338 in the Canada 2011 Census and most recently 340 in the Canada 2016 Census. The town is part of a group of communities known as the Trinity Bight. The town is home to a few small businesses, including inns and restaurants as well as the Skerwink trail which connects Port Rexton to Trinity Harbour.

Demographics 

See also
 List of cities and towns in Newfoundland and Labrador

References

Towns in Newfoundland and Labrador